Pantellerite is a type of volcanic rock, specifically a peralkaline rhyolite. It has a higher iron and lower aluminium composition than comendite.  It is named after Pantelleria, a volcanic island in the Strait of Sicily and the type location for this rock. On Pantelleria the rock is usually found as a vitrophyre containing phenocrysts of anorthoclase or sanidine.  Quartz is found only in the most strongly peralkaline rocks. Mafic minerals may include aegirine, fayalite, aenigmatite, ilmenite, and sodic amphibole (often arfvedsonite or ferrorichterite).

Occurrence
North America
Ilgachuz Range, west-central British Columbia, Canada
La Reforma, Baja California Peninsula, Mexico
Level Mountain, northwestern British Columbia, Canada

Antarctica
Mount Berlin, Marie Byrd Land
Mount Moulton, Marie Byrd Land
Mount Noice, Victoria Land

Asia
Udokan Plateau, Russia

Africa
Dabbahu Volcano, Afar Region, Ethiopia
Ma Alalta, Afar Region, Ethiopia
Tat Ali, Afar Region, Ethiopia

References

Volcanic rocks